The 2021 Team Speedway Junior European Championship was the 14th Team Speedway Junior European Championship season. It was organised by the Fédération Internationale de Motocyclisme and was the first time that the event had an age limit of under 23 years of age.

The final took place on 29 August 2021 at the Stadium Lokomotīve in Daugavpils, Latvia. The defending champions Poland won easily to claim the title for the eleventh time.

Results

Final
 Daugavpils, Latvia
 29 August 2021

See also 
 2021 Team Speedway Junior World Championship
 2021 Individual Speedway Junior European Championship

References 

2021
European Team Junior